Gruffudd ab yr Ynad Coch (fl. 1277–1282) was a Welsh court poet.

Gruffudd composed a number of poems on the theme of religion.  His greatest fame however, lies with his moving elegy for Llywelyn ap Gruffudd, Prince of Wales, which is widely considered to be one of the finest poems in Welsh and medieval European literature.

See also

Gruffudd ab Yr Ynad Coch at Wikisource

References
Dafydd Johnston, Oral Tradition in Medieval Welsh Poetry: 1100-1600, University of Wales, 2003

Welsh-language poets
13th-century Welsh poets